WKRC may refer to:

 WKRC (AM), a radio station (550 AM) licensed to Cincinnati, Ohio, United States
 WKRC-TV, a television station (channel 12) licensed to Cincinnati, Ohio, United States